Blood and Bullets is the first studio album by American heavy metal band Widowmaker, released on July 28, 1992.

"Emaheevul", "Gone Bad", "Calling for You", and "Easy Action" (Japanese bonus track) are songs Snider had previously recorded with his short-lived band Desperado for their shelved Elektra Records debut album.  The album would surface as the Bloodied, but Unbowed bootleg in the mid-1990s and eventually see an official release, titled Ace, via Angel Air in the UK and Deadline/Cleopatra in the U.S. in 2006, and Del Imaginario Discos in Argentina in 2007.

Track listing

Personnel
Dee Snider – lead vocals
Al Pitrelli - lead guitar, keyboards, backing vocals
Marc Russell – bass, backing vocals
Joey Franco – drums

Additional Personnel
Bruno Revell, Steve West, Joe Lynn Turner, Tony Harnell - backing vocals
Rich Tancredi - keyboards

Production
Ric Wake - producer
Bob Cadway - engineer
Rick Kerr - mixing
Tony Dawsey - mastering

References

1992 albums
Widowmaker (Dee Snider band) albums